This is a list of tribunals in Canada. Tribunals do not necessarily have to be referred to as such in their title, and are also commonly known as "commissions" or "boards."

Tribunals in Canada are established by federal or provincial legislation, and generally refer to any persons or institution with authority to judge, adjudicate on, or determine claims or disputes. An administrative tribunal is a kind of quasi-judicial body that makes decisions on behalf of federal and provincial/territorial governments when it is impractical or inappropriate for the government to do so itself. Appointment to such tribunals is usually by order-in-council.

Federal tribunals

The Administrative Tribunals Support Service of Canada (ATSSC) is responsible for providing support services and facilities to 11 federal administrative tribunals by way of a single, integrated organization. This organization falls under the purview of the Minister of Justice and Attorney General of Canada.

Provincial tribunals
In areas with provincial jurisdiction, tribunals are administered by the provinces themselves.

Alberta tribunals

British Columbia tribunals

Manitoba tribunals

College of Physicians & Surgeons of Manitoba Discipline Committee
Law Society of Manitoba
Manitoba Health Appeal Board
Manitoba Human Rights Commission
Manitoba Labour Board
Manitoba Securities Commission

New Brunswick tribunals

Financial and Consumer Services Tribunal
Law Society of New Brunswick
New Brunswick Assessment and Planning Appeal Board
New Brunswick Labour and Employment Board
New Brunswick Office of the Ombudsman
Workers’ Compensation Appeals Tribunal

Newfoundland and Labrador tribunals

College of Physicians and Surgeons of Newfoundland and Labrador
Information and Privacy Commissioner
Law Society of Newfoundland and Labrador
Newfoundland and Labrador Human Rights Commission
Newfoundland and Labrador Labour Relations Board

Nova Scotia tribunals

College of Physicians and Surgeons of Nova Scotia
Information and Privacy Commissioner of Nova Scotia
Nova Scotia Barristers' Society Hearing Panel
Nova Scotia Human Rights Commission
Nova Scotia Labour Board
Nova Scotia Labour Relations Board
Nova Scotia Labour Standards Tribunal
Nova Scotia Occupational Health and Safety Appeal Panel
Nova Scotia Police Review Board
Nova Scotia Securities Commission
Nova Scotia Serious Incident Response Team
Nova Scotia Utility and Review Board
Nova Scotia Workers' Compensation Appeals Tribunal

Ontario tribunals

Agriculture, Food & Rural Affairs Appeal Tribunal
Alcohol and Gaming Commission of Ontario
Assessment Review Board
Child and Family Services Review Board
College of Chiropodists of Ontario
College of Massage Therapists of Ontario
College of Nurses of Ontario Discipline Committee
College of Occupational Therapists of Ontario
College of Optometrists of Ontario
College of Physicians and Surgeons of Ontario
College of Physiotherapists of Ontario
College of Psychologists of Ontario
College of Traditional Chinese Medicine Practitioners and Acupuncturists of Ontario
Condominium Authority Tribunal
Consent and Capacity Board
Criminal Injuries Compensation Board
Financial Services Tribunal
Grievance Settlement Board
Health Professions Appeal and Review Board
Health Services Appeal and Review Board
Horse Racing Appeal Panel
Human Rights Tribunal of Ontario
Information and Privacy Commissioner of Ontario
Landlord and Tenant Board
Law Society of Ontario
Municipal Integrity Commissioners of Ontario
Normal Farm Practices Protection Board
Office of the Ombudsman of Ontario
Ontario Animal Care Review Board
Ontario Civilian Police Commission
Ontario College of Early Childhood Educators
Ontario College of Pharmacists Discipline Committee
Ontario College of Teachers
Ontario Condominium Authority
Ontario Court of the Drainage Referee
Ontario Custody Review Board
Ontario Energy Board
Ontario Fire Safety Commission
Ontario Labour Relations Board
 Ontario Land Tribunal
Ontario Licence Appeal Tribunal
Ontario Pay Equity Hearings Tribunal
Ontario Physician Payment Review Board
Ontario Public Service Grievance Board
Ontario Racing Commission
Ontario Securities Commission
Ontario Social Benefits Tribunal
Ontario Special Education (English) Tribunal
Public Service Grievance Board
Workplace Safety and Insurance Appeals Tribunal
Workplace Safety & Insurance Board

Prince Edward Island tribunals

Information and Privacy Commissioner
Prince Edward Island Human Rights Commission
Prince Edward Island Labour Relations Board

Quebec tribunals

Other disciplinary councils (conseil de discipline)
Chambre des huissiers de justice du Québec
Conseillers et conseillères d'orientation du Québec
Ordre des acupuncteurs du Québec
Ordre des administrateurs agréés du Québec
Ordre des agronomes du Québec
Ordre des architectes du Québec
Ordre des arpenteurs-géomètres du Québec
Ordre des audioprothésistes du Québec
Ordre des chiropraticiens du Québec
Ordre des comptables professionnels agréés du Québec
Ordre des criminologues du Québec
Ordre des dentistes du Québec
Ordre des ergothérapeutes du Québec
Ordre des hygiénistes dentaires du Québec
Ordre des infirmières et infirmiers auxiliaires du Québec
Ordre des infirmières et infirmiers du Québec
Ordre des ingénieurs du Québec
Ordre des médecins vétérinaires du Québec
Ordre des opticiens d'ordonnances du Québec
Ordre des optométristes du Québec
Ordre des pharmaciens du Québec
Ordre des podiatres du Québec
Ordre des psychologues du Québec
Ordre des sages-femmes du Québec
Ordre des sexologues du Québec
Ordre des techniciens et techniciennes dentaires du Québec
Ordre des technologues en imagerie médicale et en radio-oncologie du Québec
Ordre des technologues professionnels du Québec
Ordre des traducteurs, terminologues et interprètes agréés du Québec
Ordre des urbanistes du Québec
Ordre professionnel de la physiothérapie du Québec
Ordre professionnel des chimistes du Québec
Ordre professionnel des conseillers en ressources humaines et en relations industrielles agrées du Québec
Ordre professionnel des denturologistes du Québec
Ordre professionnel des diététistes du Québec
Ordre professionnel des évaluateurs agréés du Québec
Ordre professionnel des géologues du Québec
Ordre professionnel des ingénieurs forestiers du Québec
Ordre professionnel des inhalothérapeutes du Québec
Ordre professionnel des orthophonistes et audiologistes du Québec
Ordre professionnel des technologistes médicaux du Québec
Ordre professionnel des travailleurs sociaux et des thérapeutes conjugaux et familiaux du Québec
Ordre des psychoéducateurs et psychoéducatrices du Québec

Saskatchewan tribunals

Territorial tribunals

Northwest Territories

Employment Standards Appeals Office
Human Rights Adjudication Panel
Law Society of the Northwest Territories
Northwest Territories Information and Privacy Commissioner
Northwest Territories Liquor Licensing Board
Rental Officer

Nunavut

Information and Privacy Commissioner
Nunavut Human Rights Tribunal
Nunavut Registrar of Securities

Yukon

Education Appeal Tribunal
Forest Commission
Surface Rights Board
Workers' Compensation Appeal Tribunal
Yukon Human Rights Panel of Adjudicators

References

External links
 The Canadian Legal Information Institute

Canada law-related lists